Arbury Park may refer to:

 Arbury Park, former name of Orchard Park, Cambridgeshire, England
Arbury Park, former name of Raywood, Aldgate, an historic home and gardens in South Australia